Absher is a surname. Notable people with the surname include:

Dick Absher (born 1944), American football linebacker
Tessema Abshero (born 1986), Ethiopian athlete

See also
Absher (application), Saudi Arabian mobile application
Absher, Kentucky, United States, an unincorporated community
Dykersburg, Illinois, United States, an unincorporated community known as Absher in the past